Little Ben is a cast iron miniature clock tower, situated at the intersection of Vauxhall Bridge Road and Victoria Street, in Westminster, central London, close to the approach to Victoria station. In design it mimics the famous clock tower colloquially known as Big Ben at the Palace of Westminster, found at the other end of Victoria Street.

Little Ben was manufactured, according to Pevsner, by Gillett & Johnston of Croydon, and was erected in 1892; removed from the site in 1964, and restored and re-erected in 1981 by Westminster City Council with sponsorship from Elf Aquitaine Ltd "offered as a gesture of Franco-British friendship".

There is a rhyming couplet Apology for Summer Time signed "J.W.R." affixed to the body of the clock:

The couplet is a reference to the plan that the clock be permanently on Daylight Saving Time leading to the time being correct for France during the winter months and correct for the UK during the summer.  However this policy was either changed, or never implemented, since recently it is on GMT in winter and BST in summer like all other clocks in Great Britain.

А replica of Little Ben called Lorloz (painted silver) was erected in 1903 in the centre of Victoria, capital of Seychelles to mark the Diamond Jubilee of Queen Victoria in 1897.

Little Ben was removed in 2012 and put in storage during upgrade works to London Victoria station. The timepiece was refurbished and the clock tower was reinstalled on 28 February 2016.

Little Ben was listed Grade II on the National Heritage List for England in December 1987.

See also
 Big Ben

References

1892 in London
Towers completed in 1892
Clock towers in the United Kingdom
Grade II listed buildings in the City of Westminster
Grade II listed monuments and memorials
Individual clocks in England
Monuments and memorials in London
Tourist attractions in the City of Westminster
Victoria, London